Juan Ángel Espínola González (born 2 November 1994) is a Paraguayan footballer who plays as a goalkeeper for Club Olimpia

Club career
Espínola was born in Ciudad del Este. He made his senior debut with Cerro Porteño de Presidente Franco on 22 May 2013, starting in a 2–1 away win against Sportivo Carapeguá for the Primera División championship.

In 2014, Espínola moved abroad and joined Sarmiento. He returned to his home country in the following year, joining Nacional Asunción.

Midway through the 2018 season, Espínola became a regular starter at Nacional.

Internacional career
On 14 March 2019, Espínola was called up by Paraguay national team manager Eduardo Berizzo for friendlies against Peru and Mexico, but did not take part in either match.

References

External links 
 
 

1994 births
Living people
Sportspeople from Asunción
Paraguayan footballers
Association football goalkeepers
Paraguayan expatriate footballers
Sportspeople from Ciudad del Este
Cerro Porteño (Presidente Franco) footballers
Club Nacional footballers
Club Atlético Sarmiento footballers
Godoy Cruz Antonio Tomba footballers
Paraguayan Primera División players
Argentine Primera División players
Paraguayan expatriate sportspeople in Argentina
Expatriate footballers in Argentina